"" (How lovely shines the morning star) is a Lutheran hymn by Philipp Nicolai written in 1597 and first published in 1599. It inspired musical settings through centuries, notably Bach's chorale cantata , but also vocal and instrumental works by Baroque composers, Peter Cornelius, Felix Mendelssohn, Max Reger, Hugo Distler, Ernst Pepping, Mauricio Kagel and Naji Hakim.

History 
Nicolai wrote the text in response to a pestilence in 1597. The hymn, in seven stanzas, is based on Psalm 45, a mystical wedding song.

Nicolai published the hymn first in 1599 in his collection  ("Mirror of Joy of the Life Everlasting") in Frankfurt, together with "". He introduced it: "" (A spiritual bridal song of the believing soul / concerning Jesus Christ, her heavenly bridegroom, founded on the 45th Psalm of the prophet David).

Tune 
The hymn tune of "", Zahn No. 8359, was codified then as a creation of Nicolai. C. S. Terry claimed in an article in 1917 that the melody was at least 61 years older than Nicolai's publication. Joachim Stalmann wrote in 2000 that Nicolai's melody is reminiscent ("hat Anklänge") of a 1538 melody published in the Strasbourg Psalter in 1539 with the song "Jauchzet dem Herren alle Land", possibly by Jakob Dachser.

Translations 
The hymn appeared in several translations in English hymnals, beginning with "How bright appears the Morning Star!" by John Christian Jacobi, in his Psalmodica Germanica, 1722, p. 90. The first stanza, in an anonymous English translation beginning "How splendid shines the morning star", appeared in the Southern Harmony, an 1835 shape-note tunebook compiled by William Walker, where it is set to a tune called Morning Star by composer J. C. Lowry. This arrangement is repeated in An American Christmas Harp, with the addition of two more stanzas in a translation by William Mercer (1811-1873). The hymn has been referred to as the "Queen of Chorales".

Musical settings 
Other hymns to Nicolai's tune include "" by Michael Schirmer (1640).

Vocal works 
"" was seized upon by many composers of the period. Dieterich Buxtehude used it (BuxWV223), as did Johann Kuhnau.

Johann Sebastian Bach based his 1725 chorale cantata , on the complete hymn.

Wilhelm Friedemann Bach composed a cantata  (F 82). Christian Geist set the words for soprano, two violins, viola da gamba and basso continuo.

In 1870 Peter Cornelius published his second version of “Die Könige” (The kings), as part of six Weihnachtslieder, Op. 8, a song for solo voice and piano. He used the "Wie schön" melody for the accompaniment of his own vocal melody. The song was later reworked into an Epiphany anthem in English for solo voice and chorus in which the soloist sings the text "Three Kings from Persian lands afar..." (using Cornelius's original tune) over the choir which performs the chorale setting from Cornelius's original piano accompaniment. A version of "The Three Kings" is included in the first volume of the popular Willcocks and Jacques compilation Carols for Choirs.

Christus is the title given by the composer's brother Paul to fragments of an unfinished oratorio by Felix Mendelssohn, published posthumously as Op. 97. The completed portions include a four-part setting of the chorale tune in the chorus "There Shall a Star from Jacob Shine Forth."

Hugo Distler treated the tune both instrumentally as well as vocally, with an a cappella arrangement for four voices. Mauricio Kagel quoted the stanza "Zwingt die Saiten in Cythara" in his oratorio Sankt-Bach-Passion telling Bach's life, composed for the tricentenary of Bach's birth in 1985.

Instrumental works 
Bach wrote several chorale preludes for organ on the chorale. Bach's student Johann Ludwig Krebs wrote a prelude on the chorale tune. So did Pachelbel in his Erster Theil etlicher Choräle. Pachelbel's student Johann Heinrich Buttstett composed a chorale setting for organ as well. Dieterich Buxtehude also wrote a chorale fantasia  (BuxWV 223).

Felix Mendelssohn used this theme as cantus firmus in one of his early fugues for string quartet, MWV R 12, composed in 1821 when he was age 12), as a contrapuntal composition exercise when studying with Carl Friedrich Zelter.

In 1899 Max Reger composed an organ fantasy on "", the first of two, Zwei Choralphantasien, Op. 40. He also wrote in 1902 a chorale prelude, No. 49 in his collection of 52 Chorale Preludes, Op. 67. Ernst Pepping wrote in 1933 a partita, "'". Hugo Distler composed a prelude for organ entitled , as part of his Op. 8, No. 3, published in 1938. 

In 1954 Jan Koetsier composed the "Partita for English Horn and Organ" Op. 41, No. 1, which includes the melody played by the English horn over an organ accompaniment in the final movement. Howard Hanson used the choral tune as the basis for his orchestral work "Dies Natalis" (1967). In 1974 Gloria Coates composed  for amplified viola and organ. Rolf Schweitzer wrote in 1983 a meditative work for organ, . 

Australian composer, Graeme Koehne, referenced the chorale in a work titled To His servant Bach God grants a final glimpse; the morning star (1989). Naji Hakim composed in 2008 , variations for oboe (flute, violin) and organ. Organist and composer Paul Manz also created a chorale setting for organ and solo instrument called "How Lovely Shines the Morning Star" (2009).

References

Cited sources

External links 

 
 
 
 Chorale Melodies used in Bach's Vocal Works / Wie schön leuchtet der Morgenstern Bach Cantatas Website

16th-century hymns in German
Lutheran hymns based on Psalms
Hymn tunes
1597 works